Connoquenessing can refer to:
 The borough of Connoquenessing, Pennsylvania
 Connoquenessing Township, Pennsylvania
 The Connoquenessing Creek
 Connoquenessing sandstone, a member of the Pottsville Formation